The 2020 Libertarian National Convention delegates selected the Libertarian Party nominees for president and vice president in the 2020 United States presidential election. Primaries were held, but were preferential in nature and did not determine delegate allocation. The convention was originally scheduled to be held from May 21 to May 25 at the JW Marriott Austin luxury hotel in downtown Austin, Texas. On April 26, all reservations at the JW Marriott Austin were canceled in response to the COVID-19 pandemic, leaving the convention oversight committee to seek another venue for a possible July date.

After extensive discussion and debate surrounding the question of whether the party's bylaws permitted it to convene online, the convention was eventually scheduled to be held online from May 22 to May 24 to nominate the party's presidential ticket and in Orlando, Florida from July 7 to July 12 to conduct other business.

Nominations and balloting

Chair election 
Joe Bishop-Henchman, Tony D'Orazio, Jacob Lamont, Mike Shipley, and Joshua Smith ran for chair of the Libertarian National Committee. Bishop-Henchman and Smith were both incumbent at-large representatives on the committee. Bishop-Henchman was also the incumbent chair of the DC Libertarian Party. Smith previously ran for national chair at the 2018 convention. Incumbent LNC Chair Nicholas Sarwark announced that he would not be running for a fourth term and endorsed Joe Bishop-Henchman.

Endorsements

Results 
No one won a majority on the first round. Mike Shipley was eliminated, while Tony D’Orazio and Jacob Lamont withdrew. Joe Bishop-Henchman was elected on the second round

Vice-chair election 
Incumbent LNC Vice Chair Alex Merced indicated that he would not seek re-election.

Presidential nomination 
Delegates were required to submit nominating tokens for candidates who they wished to place on the ballot for the nomination. 30 Tokens was the threshold for being nominated, with Jo Jorgensen, Jacob Hornberger, Vermin Supreme, John Monds, James P. Gray and Adam Kokesh meeting that mark.

Vice-presidential nomination 
The Libertarian Party delegates selected the party's vice-presidential nominee the day after they selected the presidential nominee.

Endorsements

Nominee

Withdrawn

Theme 

In early 2019, the Libertarian Party held a contest, allowing members to decide the 2020 convention theme, charging $5 a vote. On April 11, it was announced that the winning theme was "TANSTAAFL", an acronym for "There Ain't No Such Thing As a Free Lunch", a libertarian economic concept popularized by American writer Robert Heinlein and subsequently Chicagoan school economist Milton Friedman. The phrase was also embodied in the Libertarian Party's first logo, adopted in 1972, in an image known as the "Libersign".

The second place theme was Ancapistan, an anarcho-capitalist utopia. Ancapistan, although controversial within the Party, was number one for many weeks during the contest, until in the final remaining hours leading up to midnight it was outspent by a few supporters of TANSTAAFL.

The theme contest raked in $24,007 for the LP to gear towards convention expenses.

Convention speakers

Planned speakers 
According to the convention website, the following notable people were scheduled speakers:
 Patrick M. Byrne, founder and former CEO of Overstock.com
 Jim Cantrell, CEO and co-founder of Vector Launch, Inc.
 Laura Ebke, former Libertarian Nebraska state legislator
 Jim Gray, jurist and 2012 Libertarian vice-presidential nominee
 Lisa Jaster, engineer and U.S. Army soldier
 Larry Sharpe, 2018 Libertarian nominee for Governor of New York (keynote speaker)
 Joel Trammell, entrepreneur

Keynote speaker dispute 
Black Guns Matter founder and 2019 candidate for Philadelphia City Council At-Large Maj Toure was initially chosen to be the convention's keynote speaker. This changed in November 2019, when Convention Oversight Committee Chairman Daniel Hayes rescinded Toure's invitation. Hayes cited tweets posted by Toure that were perceived as being transphobic and anti-immigrant. Larry Sharpe, host of The Sharpe Way and 2018 Libertarian candidate for New York Governor was later selected to replace Toure as keynote speaker.

Delegate allocation 
Delegates to the convention were allocated based on the number of sustaining members of the national Libertarian Party per state, as well as the percentage of the vote cast by state in the 2016 presidential election for Libertarian presidential nominee Gary Johnson. Delegates voted for changes to the national party's platform and bylaws, on members of the Libertarian National Committee and on the party's 2020 presidential and vice-presidential nominees. A total of 1,046 delegates were selected to vote at the convention.

Events 
On the night of May 21 (EST), the final debates for president and vice-president are being held. Participation was limited to those candidates who had finished in the top five in receiving "debate tokens" from the national convention delegates, and had also received over 10% of those tokens. Jim Gray, Jacob Hornberger, Jo Jorgensen, John Monds and Vermin Supreme all met this threshold and participated in the debate. For the vice-presidential debate, participation was also limited to candidates in the top five with a 10% threshold. Larry Sharpe, Spike Cohen and Ken Armstrong participated in the debate, with John McAfee placing in the top five but not receiving 10% of the tokens.

Schedule 
Due to the coronavirus epidemic, the balloting for the LP presidential nomination was held online, while the rest of the convention was scheduled  be held in person in July. Several practice runs were done the previous weekend.

Sunday, May 17th 
Final Credentials Committee Report Pre-convention

Thursday, May 21st 
 Presidential debate, moderated by John Stossel. (8:30PM Eastern Time)
 Vice-presidential debate, hosted by Jim Turney (approx 10PM Eastern Time)

Both were broadcast on the Libertarian Party's YouTube channel.

Friday, May 22nd 
 Convention opens at 6PM Eastern Time
 Credentials report.
 Adoption of Agenda.

Saturday, May 23rd 
 Business resumes at 11AM Eastern Time
 Nomination process for 2020 Libertarian Presidential Nominee

Jo Jorgensen is nominated on the fourth ballot.

Sunday, May 24th 
 Business resumes at 10AM Eastern Time
 Nomination process for 2020 Libertarian Vice-Presidential Nominee

Spike Cohen is nominated on the third ballot.

Presidential nomination results

Nomination round
Only candidates who received 30 or more tokens from the delegates qualified for the ballot.

There were several attempts to place candidates who had not received 30 tokens on the ballot anyway, with special attention drawn to an attempt to place “Great Meteor of Death” on the ballot.

Balloting 

No candidate achieved the majority on the first ballot, so there was a second ballot vote.  Due to finishing last of the six nominated candidates, Kokesh was excluded from the second ballot. No candidate achieved the majority on the second ballot, so there was a third ballot vote.  Due to finishing last of the five remaining nominated candidates, Gray was excluded from the third ballot. Gray subsequently endorsed Jorgensen in his concession speech while Gray's running mate Larry Sharpe withdrew from the vice-presidential nomination.
No candidate achieved the majority on the third ballot, so there was a fourth ballot vote.  Due to finishing last of the four remaining nominated candidates, Monds was excluded from the fourth ballot. Monds subsequently endorsed Jorgensen in his concession speech and indicated he would accept the vice-presidential nomination if offered by the delegates.

Jorgensen was nominated on the fourth ballot with 51.1% of the vote.

Vice presidential nomination results 
Only candidates who received 30 or more tokens from the convention delegates  qualified for the ballot.

Nomination round

Balloting 
Prior to voting, presidential nominee Jo Jorgensen said that she would be voting for John Monds as her vice presidential running mate, but declined to endorse a candidate.

No candidate achieved the majority on the first ballot, so there was a second ballot vote. Due to finishing last of the four nominated candidates, Kokesh was excluded from the second ballot. No candidate achieved the majority on the second ballot, so there was a third ballot vote. Due to finishing last of the three remaining nominated candidates, Armstrong was excluded from the third ballot. Armstrong endorsed Cohen in his concession speech. Cohen received the vice presidential nomination on the third ballot.

Delegate polling

National polling of delegates to the Convention 
Both of these polls were conducted using ranked choice voting, progression down the table indicates later rounds of voting as the candidate with the lowest total is eliminated.

See also 
 2020 Libertarian Party presidential primaries
 2020 Republican National Convention
 2020 Democratic National Convention
 2020 Green National Convention
 2020 Constitution Party National Convention
 2020 United States presidential election

Notes

References

External links 
 Official site

2020 conferences
2020 in Florida
2020
Political conventions in Florida
2020 in Texas
Impact of the COVID-19 pandemic on politics